The 2019–20 Saint Louis Billikens men's basketball team represented Saint Louis University in the 2019–20 NCAA Division I men's basketball season. Their head coach was Travis Ford in his fourth season at Saint Louis. The team played their home games at Chaifetz Arena as a member of the Atlantic 10 Conference. They finished the season 23–8, 12–6 in A-10 play to finish in fourth place. Their season ended when the A-10 tournament and all other postseason tournaments were canceled due to the ongoing coronavirus pandemic.

Previous season
The Billikens finished the 2018–19 season 23–13, 10–8 in A-10 play to finish in a tie for sixth place. As the No. 6 seed in the A-10 tournament, they defeated Richmond, Dayton, and Davidson to advance to the tournament championship game. There they defeated St. Bonaventure to win the tournament championship and received the conference's automatic bid to the NCAA tournament. As the No. 13 seed In the East, they lost in the first round to Virginia Tech.

Offseason

Departures

Incoming transfers

2019 recruiting class

Preseason

Roster 

Source

Schedule and results
 
|-
!colspan=9 style=| Exhibition

|-
!colspan=9 style=| Non-conference Regular season

|-
!colspan=12 style=| A-10 Regular Season
|-

|-
!colspan=9 style=| A-10 tournament
|-

Source

References

Saint Louis Billikens men's basketball seasons
Saint
Saint Louis
Saint